Pine Grove is an unincorporated community in Mendocino County, California. On the ocean just west of the community is the Point Cabrillo Light station.

References

Unincorporated communities in California
Unincorporated communities in Mendocino County, California